The following is a list of Export Promotion Organisations in India, it includes Export Promotion Councils, Commodity Boards and Export development authorities. These are Non-Profit Organizations that are responsible for developing and promoting the export industry of India.

References 

Export Promotion Organisations